Cairo 30 (translit. Al-Qāhira 30) is a 1966 Egyptian drama film directed by Salāḥ Abu Seif, and based on Naguib Mahfouz's 1945 novel Modern Cairo. The film was selected as the Egyptian entry for the Best Foreign Language Film at the 39th Academy Awards, but was not accepted as a nominée.

Cast
 Soad Hosny as Ihsan
 Ahmed Mazhar as The minister
 Hamdy Ahmed as Mahgoub Abdel Dayem
 Abdelmonem Ibrahim as Ahmed Bedier
 Tawfik El Deken as Shahata Tourky
 Abdelaziz Mikewy as Ali Taha
 Aqeila Rateb as The minister's wife
 Ahmed Tawfik as Salem El Ekshidy
 Bahiga Hafez as Ikram hanem

Synopsis
The film takes place in the 1930’s, when a young man named Mahjoub Abdeldayem (Hamdy Ahmed) comes from Upper Egypt to the slums of Cairo and gets to know a native of his village (Salem al-Ikhshidi) who offers a job lead. The job is to marry Ihsan (Soad Hosny), mistress of Qasim Bey (Ahmed Mazhar, on condition that Qasim visits her once a week.

See also
 List of submissions to the 39th Academy Awards for Best Foreign Language Film
 List of Egyptian submissions for the Academy Award for Best Foreign Language Film

References

External links
 

1966 films
1966 drama films
Egyptian drama films
1960s Arabic-language films
Films directed by Salah Abu Seif
Films based on works by Naguib Mahfouz